Fergal Patrick Keane  (born 6 January 1961) is an Irish foreign correspondent with BBC News, and an author. For some time, Keane was the BBC's correspondent in South Africa. He is a nephew of the Irish playwright, novelist and essayist John B. Keane.

Early life
Born in London, Keane grew up in Dublin and later in Cork. His father was the Listowel-born actor, Éamonn Keane. He attended three primary schools in Dublin: Scoil Bhride, a gaelscoil (Irish-language school), St. Mary's College and Terenure College, and, later, one primary school in Cork, St. Joseph's.

In a 1999 interview with the Independent, Keane said that his gaelscoil education proved useful in later life: "The grounding in the Irish language I had at Scoil Bhride has never left me. In a foreign country when I'm on the phone and don't wish people to understand what I'm saying, I speak Irish and no Serb listening in is going to crack the code."

His secondary education was at Presentation Brothers College in Cork, where Keane says he was encouraged to join the school debating society, and where he won the Provincial Gold Medal for Public Speaking (on the subject of police brutality in Ireland). Today, Keane continues to draw on this experience acting as a public speaker, event chair and after dinner speaker.

Career
On finishing school in 1979, Keane started his career as a journalist with the Limerick Leader. Subsequently, he worked for The Irish Press. Later, he moved into broadcast journalism with Raidió Teilifís Éireann (RTÉ).

Keane joined the BBC in 1989 as Northern Ireland Correspondent, but in August 1990 he was appointed their Southern African Correspondent, having covered the region during the early 1980s. From 1990 to 1994 Keane's reports covered the township unrest in South Africa, the first multi-racial elections following the end of apartheid, and the genocide in Rwanda. In 1995 he was appointed Asia Correspondent based in Hong Kong and two years later, after the handover, he returned to be based in the BBC's World Affairs Unit in London.

Keane was named as overall winner of the Amnesty International Press Awards in 1993 and won an Amnesty television prize in 1994 for his investigation of the Rwandan genocide, Journey into Darkness. He is the only journalist to have won both the Royal Television Society Journalist of the Year award and the Sony Radio Reporter of the Year in the same year – 1994. He won The Voice of The Viewer award and a Listener Award for his 1996 BBC Radio 4 From Our Own Correspondent despatch Letter to Daniel, addressed to his newborn son, and a One World Television Award in 1999. He won a BAFTA award for his documentary on Rwanda, Valentina's Story. He has won the James Cameron Prize for war reporting, the Edward R. Murrow Award for foreign reporting, the Index on Censorship prize for journalistic integrity, and the 1995 Orwell Prize for his book Season of Blood. In May 2009 he won a Sony Gold Award for his Radio 4 series Taking A Stand. He also won a Peabody Award and an Emmy for his reporting as part of the BBC team covering the 2015 refugee crisis.

In the three-part documentary Forgotten Britain, serialised on the BBC in May 2000, Keane travelled across the country meeting people living on the edge in affluent societies.
Keane was a patron of the UK-based development agency Msaada, which assisted survivors of the Rwandan genocide.

In 2010, he published his first history work Road of Bones: the Siege of Kohima 1944, an account of the epic battle which halted the Japanese invasion of India in 1944.

One of his projects is the five-part series The Story of Ireland, a 2011 documentary co-produced by BBC Northern Ireland and Raidió Teilifís Éireann.

Keane has been awarded honorary degrees in literature from the University of Strathclyde, Bournemouth University and Staffordshire University. On 15 December 2011, he received an honorary Doctor of Letters from the University of Liverpool. Keane was appointed an OBE for services to journalism in the 1997 New Year's Honours list.

In April 2018 he was awarded the Christopher Ewart-Biggs Memorial Prize for Wounds.

In November 2018, Keane provided the commentary for the Westminster Abbey service marking the centenary of the Armistice.

The BBC revealed in January 2020 that Keane had suffered from post-traumatic stress disorder (PTSD) for several years, and consequently moved out of his role as Africa editor in order to aid his recovery. In May 2022 he presented  the documentary Fergal Keane: Living with PTSD on BBC Two, in which he laid bare the impact of PTSD on himself and others like him. He explored how the disorder had led him to consider withdrawing from conflict reporting and investigated the latest scientific thinking behind the disorder and its treatment.

Published works

References

External links
BBC – Biography from the BBC Press Office – 2006-11-04
BBC News – The power of storytelling – 2005-09-01
BBC Panorama – The Accused – aired 2001-06-17 (transcript and comments)
Frontline – Ghosts of Rwanda interview
Letter to Daniel, link to Audio

1961 births
Living people
BAFTA winners (people)
BBC newsreaders and journalists
Officers of the Order of the British Empire
Panorama (British TV programme)
People educated at Presentation Brothers College, Cork
RTÉ newsreaders and journalists
The Irish Press people
People with post-traumatic stress disorder